Euseius alstoniae is a species of mite in the family Phytoseiidae.

References

alstoniae
Articles created by Qbugbot
Animals described in 1975